Ilyinsky District is an administrative district (raion) of Perm Krai, Russia; one of the thirty-three in the krai. Municipally, it is incorporated as Ilyinsky Municipal District. It is located in the center of the krai in the basin of the Kama River and its tributaries the Obva and the Chyormoz. Its administrative center is the rural locality (a settlement) of Ilyinsky. Population:  The population of the administrative center accounts for 32.0% of the district's total population.

History
The district was established in December 1923.

Economy
The economy of the district is based on agriculture, forestry, engineering, food, and printing industries.

Demographics
Russians at 95.3% and the Komi-Permyak people at 1.7% are the predominant ethnic groups in the district.

Notable residents 

Nina Averina (born 1935 in Ilyinsky), writer
Sergei Teploukhov (1888–1934), archaeologist

References

Notes

Sources

Districts of Perm Krai